Nikon may refer to:

 Nikon, a Japanese camera and optics manufacturer (1917–present)
 Patriarch Nikon (1605–1681), a Russian prelate
 Saint Nikon the Metanoeite (c. 930–c. 998), a Byzantine monk and preacher
 Nikon of the Black Mountain (c. 1025–c. 1100), a Byzantine ecclesiastical writer
 Nikon Liolin (born 1945) is an Albanian bishop who serves as the head of the Orthodox Church in America's Albanian Archdiocese and New England diocese.
 Nikon Nizetas, cover name of WW1 spy Alfred Redl
 An ancient Greek pirate from the Pherae

 Nikon, a second century CE trading port in southern Somalia